Daguao may refer to:

Places
Daguao, Ceiba, Puerto Rico, a barrio
Daguao, Naguabo, Puerto Rico, a barrio